Shibuya-AX (stylized as SHIBUYA-AX) was a concert hall in Shibuya, Tokyo, Japan, near the Yoyogi National Gymnasium.

It was the only purpose-built concert hall or "live house" in the Tokyo metropolitan area that could accommodate 1,500 people. It was a popular venue for concerts by both Japanese and western artists.

On September 27, 2013,  was announced through official site the end of activities for next May 31, 2014. The staff of Shibuya-AX requested J, the artist with the most performances at the concert hall, perform one last time at the venue. The concerts entitled -Thank You AX!! Good Bye AX!!- were held on May 3–4, 2014.

Notable events 
 Buck-Tick's 2004 live album At the Night Side contains songs that were recorded at their April 30, 2003 performance here.
 Sonata Arctica's performance in this venue on February 5, 2005 (during the Reckoning Night world tour) was recorded and later released as a live DVD For The Sake of Revenge (released in 2006).
 Lady Gaga performed here on June 8, 2009, during The Fame Ball Tour. 
 From May 5 to 9, 2011, J held five consecutive concerts here titled "J 14th Anniversary Special Live Set Fire Get Higher -Fire Higher 2011-", each day with different bands such as Mass of the Fermenting Dregs, Nothing's Carved in Stone, Avengers in Sci-Fi, Pay Money to My Pain and The Hiatus.
 South Korean Girl Group, T-ara held First Showcase in this venue on July 5, 2011, before release their debut Japanese single Bo Peep Bo Peep .
 Shibuya-AX served as one of the venues for A-Nation 2012 Music Week.
 For consecutive 3 years, Shibuya-AX was the official "home" of Shibuya-based pop idol group Passpo☆ (last show was on March 1, 2014)

References

External links

Former music venues
Dentsu
Music venues in Tokyo
Nippon TV
Mass media in Tokyo
Music venues completed in 2000
2000 establishments in Japan
2014 disestablishments in Japan
Buildings and structures in Shibuya